On the morning and early afternoon of June 3, 2020, a powerful derecho (a line of windstorms moving together) crossed Pennsylvania and New Jersey, causing four confirmed fatalities. It was the deadliest derecho in the region since 1950.

The storms were part of a mesoscale convective system (a complex of associated thunderstorms) which formed just outside of Oil City, Pennsylvania, and began moving eastward across Lake Erie just after 5 a.m. (EDT). The Storm Prediction Center (SPC) made its first warning around 8:30 a.m., and damaging wind reports began about 20 minutes later. A severe thunderstorm watch was put into effect around the region just after 10 a.m., as warm, humid temperatures further destabilized the squall line. By the time that the storm crossed the Delaware River into New Jersey, wind speeds were equivalent to those of a Category 1 hurricane. By 2 p.m., the storm had dissipated off the coast.

Fallen trees and power lines resulted in four deaths across southeastern Pennsylvania. Wind speeds also resulted in severe property damage from fallen trees, and at least two buildings lost their roofs. Over 850,000 individuals lost electricity due to storm damage, and for many, power was not restored for several days. PECO Energy recruited service crews from outside the region to work on restoring electricity in homes, while drone technology was used to survey the damage. Repairs were slowed by several days of severe weather following the initial storm, but by June 6, the thunderstorms had come to an end.

Meteorological history 
A mesoscale convective system that formed just outside of Oil City, Pennsylvania, began moving eastward across Lake Erie around 5:12 a.m. EDT on the morning of June 3, 2020. By 8:32 a.m. EDT, the storm system had moved into northwestern Pennsylvania, and the Storm Prediction Center (SPC) warned that as it progressed and encountered the warmer temperatures in the eastern part of the state, there was a greater threat of severe weather. The first reports of damaging winds emerged twenty minutes later. The SPC issued its first severe thunderstorm watch at 10:05 a.m. By 10:34 a.m. EDT, the squall line was moving into southeastern Pennsylvania, where the warm, humid temperatures would further destabilize the system.

Significant wind damage began as the system entered Berks County, Pennsylvania, and continued through the Delaware Valley towards Ocean County, New Jersey. The  wind gust measured in Berks was the strongest on record, surpassing the  gusts recorded during Hurricane Hazel. Social media footage from the storm showed funnel clouds in Philadelphia and hail in State College, Pennsylvania. The storm crossed the Delaware River around 12:30 p.m. EDT and reached Long Beach Island by 1:15 p.m. By 2 p.m. EDT, the storm had moved off of the New Jersey coast.

Wind speeds reached in New Jersey were equivalent to a Category 1 hurricane, but no hurricane, tropical storm, or tornado was recorded. To be considered a derecho, the National Weather Service states that wind damage must extend at least  and include gusts of at least . Derecho storms are also known for the characteristic bow-like shape of their radar profile The SPC confirmed on the afternoon of June 3 that the storm was classified as a derecho. The evening before, a "ring of fire" pattern had settled over most of the contiguous United States. In such a scenario, thunderstorms moving across the ridge of a high-pressure area feed off of both the warm, humid air of the high-pressure region and the adjacent jet stream winds, causing rapidly-intensifying, unpredictable storms. In the days preceding the derecho, that weather pattern had caused damaging thunderstorms in the Midwestern United States.

After the initial derecho passed, the warm weather returned to the region, allowing for more atmospheric destabilization and another set of thunderstorms that evening. Around 3:10 p.m. EDT, an outflow-modified cold front formed over south-central Kentucky, northwest Pennsylvania, and central Ohio, carrying the risk of isolated wind gusts, hail, and scattered thunderstorms. A second severe thunderstorm watch was issued for the Mid-Atlantic region at 3:50 p.m. Bill Bunting of the SPC characterized the later thunderstorms by their "strobe-like lightning, and prolonged thunder that evoked an oceanic roar", and the rains were heavier in the later, slower storm than they had been for the faster derecho. The evening storm also caused damage in areas of New Jersey, including Beach Haven, Hammonton, Folsom, Port Republic, and Mullica Township. A tornado warning was issued in southern New Jersey and southeastern Pennsylvania at 7:15 p.m. and expired 30 minutes later. At 8:30 p.m., The Philadelphia Inquirer reported that there had been no confirmed tornado reports in the region. In Carlisle, Pennsylvania, which had avoided damage from the initial derecho, a microburst (a sudden strong, spreading downdraft) later in the evening caused extensive damage to trees and power lines. The remaining storms dissipated offshore by 10 p.m. EDT, concluding the severe weather for the day.

Impact 

The June 2020 derecho was the first to impact the Pennsylvania–New Jersey region since June 2012, when a storm moved east from Iowa into southern Pennsylvania. Four fatalities were associated with the derecho, making it the deadliest such storm in the region since 1950. In Belmont Hills and Penn Wynne, Pennsylvania, respectively, two individuals were killed when trees fell onto the roofs of their cars. In Lower Moreland Township, the 38-year-old director of golf at Philmont Country Club was killed when a tree collapsed into the building where he had been working. The fourth fatality occurred in Delaware County, where derecho winds topped live overhead power lines into a home, causing the building to catch fire. A second individual inside the house escaped.

In addition to human death and injury, the derecho caused extensive property damage as trees were uprooted from the ground, landing on and crushing homes and vehicles. The National Weather Service office in Mount Holly, New Jersey, logged over 250 wind damage reports in the region resulting from the derecho, most resulting from felled trees and downed power lines, some of which collapsed on buildings and residences. Most of the damage was concentrated in a stretch from Reading, Pennsylvania, to Philadelphia, with areas such as the Lehigh Valley spared the brunt of the storm. In Lansdale, Pennsylvania, the storm removed the roof from a 150-unit apartment building, leaving the complex uninhabitable. A report from the Montgomery County board of commissioners also stated that the storm had caused several serious fires in the region. On Long Beach Island, the St. Francis Community Center also lost part of its roof to derecho winds.

The storm also caused massive power outages in southeastern Pennsylvania and New Jersey. More than 850,000 individuals lost electricity on June 3, including 200,000 in New Jersey. Several long-term care facilities in Montgomery County, Pennsylvania lost electricity and utilized emergency generators to protect the residents. The following day, around 100,000 homes and businesses in New Jersey remained without power. Most of the outages were located in Burlington and Camden County, New Jersey. In Pennsylvania, over 56,000 individuals remained without power on June 5. Although the number dwindled to 16,500 on Sunday, June 6, PECO Energy received several complaints from those individuals about their lack of electricity during a period of high temperatures, as well as the company's delayed time frames for when their electricity might be restored. PECO Energy recruited service crews from states including Oklahoma, Illinois, Florida, and New Hampshire to undertake repairs and restorations. PECO, who had been using drone technology for several months prior to the storm but had been seeking opportunities to incorporate the technology into storm restoration, used their drones to assess damage aerially at speeds that would have been much slower from the ground. All power was restored by June 9.

Aftermath 
Repairing the damage caused by the derecho was inhibited by additional severe thunderstorms in the following days. The National Weather Service and local meteorologists warned that "several rounds of progressive thunderstorm complexes" would extend through the Lehigh Valley until the storm front was displaced by an east-to-west boundary on June 6. On June 4, the NWS warned that another round of thunderstorms would move through central Pennsylvania after 4 p.m. EDT, continuing through the night with a possibility of flooding. A loose series of storms passed through New Jersey that afternoon, dissipating just after midnight.

Another round of slow-moving thunderstorms passed through the region on June 5, with most of New Jersey and southeastern Pennsylvania placed under a flash flood watch. Areas of northern Delaware and Maryland were also placed under watch. Unlike the wind damage caused by the derecho, heavy rainfall provided a greater threat for this later day of severe weather. Thunderstorms passed over the region between 3 and 10 p.m. Flooding was reported in Pennsylvania as well, particularly around the Schuylkill Expressway, Route 202 in Chester County, and around the Delaware River, where a flood advisory was triggered.

See also 

 List of derecho events
 New York State Labor Day derechos
 August 2020 Midwest derecho

References

External links 

Derechos in the United States
2020 in Pennsylvania
2020 in New Jersey
2020 meteorology
2020 natural disasters in the United States
June 2020 events in the United States